Miki Rumenov Orachev (born 19 March 1996) is a Bulgarian footballer who currently plays as a defender for Lokomotiv Sofia. Orachev prefers to play as a left-back but can also play as a left winger.

Career

Levski Sofia

First spell
Born in Blagoevgrad, Orachev began playing football for local side Pirin. On 19 July 2011, he joined Levski Sofia's academy.

Orachev made his first team debut in a 2–1 league home loss against Litex Lovech on 12 April 2014, coming on as a substitute for Ricardo Nunes. His first goal for the club came on 4 May 2015, a 17-metre strike in a 5–0 win at Haskovo.

On 14 July 2017 he made his Europa League debut for the team in a match against NK Maribor.

Loan to Lokomotov Sofia
In January 2017, Orachev was loaned to Second League club Lokomotiv Sofia until the end of the season. He made his debut for the team on 25 February 2017 in a league match against Spartak Pleven.

Return to Levski
Although there was information that his loan would be extended, Orachev returned in the beginning of June from his loan spell. He joined the first training of the team on 13 June 2017.

Septemvri Sofia
On 22 December 2017 Levski's executive manager Asen Bukarev announced that Orachev would be transferred in Septemvri Sofia. He officially signed a contract on 28 December for a year and a half. He completed his debut for the team on 17 February 2018 in the first league match for the year, against Etar Veliko Tarnovo.

On 7 March he left the field in the 32nd minute due to low blood pressure. On 22 March it was announced that he would miss the rest of the season due to heart problems.

Statistics

Club

Personal life
Miki is a cousin of the retired footballer and now manager Malin Orachev.

References

External links
 
 Profile at LevskiSofia.info

1996 births
Living people
Bulgarian footballers
Bulgaria youth international footballers
Association football defenders
First Professional Football League (Bulgaria) players
PFC Levski Sofia players
FC Lokomotiv 1929 Sofia players
FC Septemvri Sofia players
Sportspeople from Blagoevgrad